In probability theory, a stochastic process is said to be continuous in probability or stochastically continuous if its distributions converge whenever the values in the index set converge.

Definition 

Examples and Applications 
Continuity in probability is a sometimes used as one of the defining property for Lévy process. Any process that is continuous in probability and has independent increments has a version that is càdlàg. As a result, some authors immediately define Lévy process as being càdlàg and having independent increments.

References 

Stochastic processes